Sheikh Chand Mohammad (1 March 1931 – 11 May 2019) was an Indian lawyer and politician belonging to Indian National Congress. He was elected twice as a member of Assam Legislative Assembly. He was the speaker and deputy speaker of Assam Legislative Assembly too.

Biography
Chand Mohammad was born on 1 March 1931. His father's name was Aladar Ali and his mother's name was Fulashree Bibi. He studied in  Cotton College. Then he studied in B. Borooah College. He pursued law degree from there. After completing study he practised law at the Gauhati High Court.

Chand Mohammad elected as a member of Assam Legislative Assembly from Barkhetry in 1978. Later, he was appointed deputy speaker of the Assam Legislative Assembly on 30 March 1978. He served as deputy speaker of the Assam Legislative Assembly from 30 March 1978 to 6 November 1979. Then he was appointed speaker of the Assam Legislative Assembly on 7 November 1979. He served as speaker of the Assam Legislative Assembly from 7 November 1979 to 7 January 1986. He was also elected as a member of Assam Legislative Assembly from Barkhetry in 1983.

Chand Mohammad died on 11 May 2019 at the age of 88.

References

1931 births
2019 deaths
Indian National Congress politicians
Assam MLAs 1978–1983
Assam MLAs 1983–1985
Speakers of the Assam Legislative Assembly
Gauhati University alumni
People from Nalbari district
20th-century Indian lawyers
21st-century Indian lawyers
Deputy Speakers of the Assam Legislative Assembly